The Ambassador of Russia to Luxembourg is the official representative of the President and the Government of the Russian Federation to the Grand Duke and the Government of Luxembourg.

The ambassador and his staff work at large in the Russian embassy in Luxembourg.

History of diplomatic relations

Russian relations with Luxembourg date back into the nineteenth century, when as part of the Concert of Europe, the Russian Empire was one of the signatories to the Treaty of London in 1867, making it one of the guarantors of the borders of the Grand Duchy and its neutrality. Formal diplomatic relations were established in 1891, and after the Russian revolutions in 1917 and the emergence of the Soviet Union, an exchange of diplomats was agreed in 1935. Relations were interrupted for a time by the Second World War, during which time Luxembourg was occupied by Axis forces.

Following the German invasion of Luxembourg on 10 May 1940, a Luxembourg government in exile was established in London. Relations were restored in 1946, albeit with a non-resident ambassador, Soviet affairs prior to 1956 being handled by the ambassador to Belgium, who had dual accreditation. It was not until late 1960 that the mission was upgraded to the level of an embassy, with  appointed as ambassador on 28 June 1961. With the dissolution of the Soviet Union at the end of 1991, the Russian Federation emerged as the Soviet Union's legal successor. The incumbent ambassador of the Soviet Union to Luxembourg, Chinghiz Aitmatov, continued as representative of Russia until 1994.

List of representatives (1936 - present)

Representatives of the Soviet Union to Luxembourg (1936-1991)

Representatives of the Russian Federation to Luxembourg (1991-present)

References 

 
Luxembourg
Russia